Sabarmati is an area located in Ahmedabad, India.

Sabarmati is located on the bank of the Sabarmati River. Sabarmati is a developed and rich area of the western Ahmedabad. Main areas of Sabarmati are Ramnagar, Dharmnagar, Javaharchowk, Kabirchowk, Ranip, Kaligam, Motera, Janata Nagar, Chandkheda, D-cabin.

Sabarmati is very religious place to live in. There are many communities living in Sabarmati very peacefully. But the most population of this locality is Hindu or Jain. There are many famous jain temples are located in Sabarmati. Gujarat Cricket Association (Motera Stadium), Torrent Power House and Sabarmati River are surrounding places. Large number of good hotels, restaurants and snacks bars are available. Most of all urban facilities including Bus Stops, Railway Station, Banks, Post Offices, Hospitals are available. Connectivity with highway and airport is again part of attractions for better living zone. Nearest international airport is 10 km away. Residential area with peaceful communities and availability of all modern resources makes this place one of the best place to live.

References

Neighbourhoods in Ahmedabad